Nigel Dalcour Sinker (born 19 April 1946) is an English former first-class cricketer.

The son of Philip Tennant Sinker and Mary Louisa Pearson, he was born in April 1946 at Writtle, Essex. He was educated at Winchester College, before going up to Jesus College, Cambridge. While studying at Cambridge, he played first-class cricket for Cambridge University Cricket Club in 1966 and 1967, making thirteen appearances. He scored 188 runs in his these matches, at an average of 9.89 and a highest score of 31 not out. With his slow left-arm orthodox bowling, he took 22 wickets at a bowling average of 32.31 and best figures of 4 for 10.

References

External links

1946 births
Living people
Sportspeople from Chelmsford
People educated at Winchester College
Alumni of Jesus College, Cambridge
English cricketers
Cambridge University cricketers